AIDS is the third stage of HIV/AIDS, a spectrum of conditions caused by infection with the human immunodeficiency virus (HIV).

AIDS or Aids also may refer to:

Arts, entertainment and media
 AIDS (journal), a journal about HIV and AIDS
 Aids (film), a 1987 Malayalam film
 Astro Investigation and Defence Service, a fictional organisation in the film Bad Taste
 Alles ist die Sekte (A.i.d.S.), a German rap duo

Technology
 AIDS (aeronautics) (aircraft integrated data system), an aircraft system
 AIDS (computer virus)
 AIDS (Trojan horse), in computers

Other uses
 Aid, a voluntary transfer of resources from one country to another
 Riding aids, the cues given by riders to their horses
 Almost ideal demand system, a consumer demand model in industrial organization

See also
 Aid (disambiguation)
 Aides (disambiguation)
 Ayds, an appetite-suppressant candy
 HIV (human immunodeficiency virus)